Lena Birgitta Cronqvist Tunström (born 1938) is a Swedish painter, graphic artist and sculptor. Considered to be one of Scandinavia's most prominent Expressionists, her biographically-inspired works include self portraits, some with her child, sometimes depicting the unpleasant features of life. She has illustrated the books of her late husband Göran Tunström and created lithographs for one of August Strindberg's plays. As a sculptor, she has worked with glass and bronze. Her artworks have been widely exhibited and are in the collections of Nationalmuseet and Moderna Museet in Stockholm.

Biography

Born in Karlstad on 31 December 1938,  Lena Cronqvist studied at Stockholm's Konstfack (1958–1959) and at the Royal Swedish Academy of Fine Arts (1959–1964). In 1964, she married the writer Göran Tunström who died in 2000. 

When she was 18, Cronqvist visited the Munch Room in Norway's National Gallery in Oslo. Edvard Munch's art left a lasting impression on her. The works she created in her "death series" are reminiscent of Munch's paintings.

Cronqvist gained prominence in Sweden in the mid-1960s, creating not only paintings and graphics but textiles and sculptures. Her bold, intensive colourings contribute to her rather harsh expressionism, re-introducing a personalized approach in Swedish art. Depicting hospital scenes, Madonnas and girls playing morbid games, as well as many biographical portrayals, her work in the 1960s and 1970s frequently depicted scenes of anguish and illness. She has illustrated the books of her late husband Göran Tunström and created a series of lithographs for Strindberg's Ett Drömspel. As a sculptor, she has worked with glass and bronze. Her artworks have been widely exhibited and are in the collections of Nationalmuseet and Moderna Museet in Stockholm.

Awards

In 1994, Cronqvist was awarded the Prince Eugen Medal. She has a long relationship with her native Karlstad. Her bronze sculpture Hand i hand stands in its Museiparken. In 2012, the city awarded her its Fröding Stipendium.

References

1938 births
Living people
People from Karlstad
20th-century Swedish painters
21st-century Swedish painters
Swedish sculptors
Swedish textile artists
Graphic artists
Swedish illustrators
Swedish women painters
Swedish women sculptors
Recipients of the Prince Eugen Medal